Scott Thompson is an American college basketball coach. He was the head coach at Rice University from 1987 to 1992, Wichita State University from 1992 to 1996 and Cornell University from 1996 to 2000.

References

Year of birth missing (living people)
Living people
American men's basketball coaches
American men's basketball players
Arizona Wildcats men's basketball coaches
Basketball coaches from Illinois
Basketball players from Chicago
Cornell Big Red men's basketball coaches
Iowa Hawkeyes men's basketball coaches
Iowa Hawkeyes men's basketball players
Notre Dame Fighting Irish men's basketball coaches
Rice Owls men's basketball coaches
Sportspeople from Chicago
Wichita State Shockers men's basketball coaches
Shooting guards